Joaquim António Dinis (born 1 December 1947, Luanda) is a former Angolan-Portuguese footballer. He played for Sporting, FC Porto and União Leiria in the Portuguese Liga, as forward.
He is a brother of Angolan basketball coach Carlos Dinis.

Dinis gained 14 caps and scored 5 goals for the Portugal national team. He did a great partnership with Eusébio at the Brazil Independence Cup in 1972, scoring all the 5 international goals of his career at the competition. He gave the name to the Joaquim Dinis Stadium in Luanda.

|}

External links 
 

1947 births
Living people
C.D. Primeiro de Agosto players
Clube Atlético de Luanda players
Sporting CP footballers
FC Porto players
U.D. Leiria players
C.D. Primeiro de Agosto managers
Angolan footballers
Portugal international footballers
Portuguese footballers
Primeira Liga players
Association football forwards
Portuguese football managers
Footballers from Luanda